Herman "Junior" Cook (July 22, 1934 – February 3, 1992) was an American hard bop tenor saxophone player.

Biography 
Cook was born in Pensacola, Florida. A member of a musical family, he started on alto saxophone before switching to tenor during his high school years.

After playing with Dizzy Gillespie in 1958, Cook was a member of the Horace Silver Quintet (1958–1964); when Silver left the group in the hands of Blue Mitchell Cook stayed in the quintet for five more years (1964–1969). Later associations included Freddie Hubbard, Elvin Jones, George Coleman, Louis Hayes (1975–1976), Bill Hardman (1979–1989), and the McCoy Tyner big band.

In addition to many appearances as a sideman, Junior Cook recorded as a leader for Jazzland (1961), Catalyst (1977), Muse, and SteepleChase.

He also taught at Berklee School of Music for a year during the 1970s.

In the early 1990s, Cook was playing with Clifford Jordan, and also leading his own group. He died in February 1992 in his apartment in New York City, aged 57.

Discography

As leader/co-leader 
 Junior's Cookin' (Jazzland, 1961)
Ichi-Ban (Timeless, 1976) with Louis Hayes
 Pressure Cooker (Catalyst, 1977)
 Good Cookin'  (Muse, 1979)
 Somethin's Cookin'  (Muse, 1981)
 The Place to Be (Steeplechase, 1988)
 On a Misty Night (Steeplechase, 1989)
 You Leave Me Breathless (Steeplechase, 1991)

As sideman 
With Horace Silver
 Live at Newport '58 (Blue Note, 1958 [2008])
 6 Pieces of Silver (Blue Note, 1956–58)
 Finger Poppin' (Blue Note, 1959)
 Blowin' the Blues Away (Blue Note, 1959)
 Horace-Scope (Blue Note, 1960)
 Doin' the Thing (Blue Note, 1961)
 Paris Blues (Pablo, 1962, [2002])
 The Tokyo Blues (Blue Note, 1962)
 Silver's Serenade (Blue Note, 1963)
 Song for My Father (Blue Note, 1964)
 Music to Ease Your Disease (Silverto, 1988)

With Barry Harris
 Luminescence! (Prestige, 1967)

With Bill Hardman
Home (Muse, 1978)
Politely (Muse, 1981 [1982])
Focus (Muse, 1982)
What's Up (SteepleChase, 1989)

With Freddie Hubbard
 Sing Me a Song of Songmy (Atlantic, 1971) – co-led with İlhan Mimaroğlu
 Keep Your Soul Together (CTI Records, 1973)
 High Energy (Columbia, 1974)
 Polar AC (CTI Records, 1974)
 Live At Carnegie Hall 1972 (Stepper Music, 2007)
With Clifford Jordan
 Two Tenor Winner (Criss Cross, 1984)
Play What You Feel (Mapleshade, 1990 [1997])
With Blue Mitchell
 The Cup Bearers (Riverside, 1962)
 The Thing to Do (Blue Note, 1964)
 Down with It! (Blue Note, 1965)
 Bring It Home to Me (Blue Note, 1966)
 Boss Horn (Blue Note, 1966)
 Heads Up!  (Blue Note, 1967)

With others
 Kenny Burrell: Swingin' (Blue Note, 1956 [rel. 1980])
 Kenny Burrell: Blue Lights (Blue Note, 1958)
 Dave Bailey Sextet: One Foot in the Gutter (Epic, 1960)
 Roy Brooks: Beat (Jazz Workshop, 1964)
 Barry Harris: Luminescence! (Prestige, 1967)
 Cedar Walton: Cedar! (Prestige, 1967)
 John Patton: That Certain Feeling (Blue Note, 1968; Mosaic Select, 2003)
 Don Patterson: Opus De Don (Prestige, 1968)
 Louis Smith: Prancin' (SteepleChase, 1979)
 Mickey Tucker: Sojourn (Xanadu, 1977)
 McCoy Tyner: Uptown/Downtown (Milestone, 1988)
 Walter Bishop Jr.: Hot House (Muse, 1979)
 Louis Hayes: Ichi-Ban (Timeless, 1979)
 Vibration Society Hilton Ruiz Steve Turre: The Music of Rahsaan Roland Kirk (Stash, 1986)
 Larry Gales Sextet: A Message from Monk (Candid, 1990)
 Bertha Hope: Elmo's Fire (Steeplechase, 1991)

References 

1934 births
1992 deaths
Musicians from Pensacola, Florida
American jazz tenor saxophonists
American male saxophonists
Jazz musicians from Florida
Muse Records artists
SteepleChase Records artists
20th-century American saxophonists
20th-century American male musicians
American male jazz musicians